"Now It Can Be Told" is a popular song written by Irving Berlin for the 1938 film Alexander's Ragtime Band, where it was introduced by Alice Faye and Don Ameche. It was nominated for an Academy Award in 1938 but lost out to "Thanks for the Memory".

Notable recordings

Mildred Bailey (1938)
Shep Fields collaborated with John Serry Sr. to record this song for Bluebird Records in 1938.
Tony Bennett - Bennett/Berlin (1987)
Bing Crosby - recorded May 23, 1938 with John Scott Trotter and his Orchestra. This reached No. 7 in the charts of the day.
Tommy Dorsey - the most popular recording of the song in 1938, vocal by Jack Leonard. This reached the No. 2 spot in the charts of the day.
Billy Eckstine and Sarah Vaughan - included in their album Sarah Vaughan and Billy Eckstine Sing the Best of Irving Berlin (1957)
Ella Fitzgerald - Ella Fitzgerald Sings the Irving Berlin Songbook (1958)
Vera Lynn (1940)
Tony Martin - another chart success in 1938, peaking at No. 13.

References

Songs written by Irving Berlin
1938 songs
Songs written for films
Mildred Bailey songs
Bluebird Records singles